The canton of Migennes is an administrative division of the Yonne department, central France. Its borders were modified at the French canton reorganisation which came into effect in March 2015. Its seat is in Migennes.

It consists of the following communes:
 
Bassou
Bonnard
Brion
Bussy-en-Othe
Charmoy
Cheny
Chichery
Épineau-les-Voves
Laroche-Saint-Cydroine
Migennes

References

Cantons of Yonne